Krazy Kat (also known as Krazy & Ignatz in some reprints and compilations) is an American newspaper comic strip, by cartoonist George Herriman, which ran from 1913 to 1944. It first appeared in the New York Evening Journal, whose owner, William Randolph Hearst, was a major booster for the strip throughout its run. The characters had been introduced previously in a side strip with Herriman's earlier creation, The Dingbat Family. The phrase "Krazy Kat" originated there, said by the mouse by way of describing the cat. Set in a dreamlike portrayal of Herriman's vacation home of Coconino County, Arizona, Krazy  mixture of offbeat surrealism, innocent playfulness and poetic, idiosyncratic language has made it a favorite of comics aficionados and art critics for more than 80 years.

The strip focuses on the curious relationship between a guileless, carefree, simple-minded cat named Krazy and a short-tempered mouse named Ignatz. Krazy nurses an unrequited love for the mouse. However, Ignatz despises Krazy and constantly schemes to throw bricks at Krazy's head, which Krazy interprets as a sign of affection, uttering grateful replies such as "Li'l dollink, allus f'etful", or "Li'l ainjil". A third principal character, Officer Bull Pupp, often appears and tries to "protect" Krazy by thwarting Ignatz' attempts and imprisoning him. Later on, Officer Pupp falls in love with Krazy.

Despite the slapstick simplicity of the general premise, the detailed characterization, combined with Herriman's visual and verbal creativity,  made Krazy Kat one of the first comics to be widely praised by intellectuals and treated as "serious" art. Art critic Gilbert Seldes wrote a lengthy panegyric to the strip in 1924, calling it "the most amusing and fantastic and satisfactory work of art produced in America today." Poet e. e. cummings, another Herriman admirer, wrote the introduction to the first collection of the strip in book form. These critical appraisals by Seldes and Cummings were influential in establishing Krazy Kats reputation as a work of genius. Though Krazy Kat was only a modest success during its initial run, in more recent years, many modern cartoonists have cited the strip as a major influence.

Overview 

Krazy Kat takes place in a heavily stylized version of Coconino County, Arizona, with Herriman filling the page with caricatured flora and fauna, and rock formation landscapes typical of the Painted Desert. These backgrounds tend to change dramatically between panels, even while the characters remain stationary. While the local geography is fluid, certain sites were stable—and featured so often in the strip as to become iconic. These latter included Officer Pupp's jailhouse and Kolin Kelly's brickyard. A Southwestern visual style is evident throughout, with clay-shingled rooftops, trees planted in pots with designs imitating Navajo art, along with references to Mexican-American culture. The strip also occasionally features incongruous trappings borrowed from the stage, with curtains, backdrops, theatrical placards, and sometimes even floor lights framing the panel borders.

The descriptive passages mix whimsical, often alliterative language with phonetically-spelled dialogue and a strong poetic sensibility ("Agathla, centuries aslumber, shivers in its sleep with splenetic splendor, and spreads abroad a seismic spasm with the supreme suavity of a vagabond volcano.") Herriman was also fond of experimenting with unconventional page layouts in his Sunday strips, including panels of various shapes and sizes, arranged in whatever fashion he thought would best tell the story.

Though the basic concept of the strip is simple, Herriman always found ways to tweak the formula. Ignatz's plans to surreptitiously lob a brick at Krazy's head sometimes succeed; other times Officer Pupp outsmarts Ignatz and imprisons him. The interventions of Coconino County's other anthropomorphic animal residents, and even forces of nature, occasionally change the dynamic in unexpected ways. Other strips have Krazy's imbecilic or gnomic pronouncements irritating the mouse so much that he goes to seek out a brick in the final panel. Even self-referential humor is evident—in one strip, Officer Pupp, having arrested Ignatz, berates Herriman for not having finished drawing the jailhouse.

Public reaction at the time was mixed; many were puzzled by its iconoclastic refusal to conform to linear comic strip conventions and straightforward gags. But publishing magnate William Randolph Hearst loved Krazy Kat, and it continued to appear in his papers throughout its run, sometimes only by his direct order.

Cast of characters

Krazy Kat 
Simple-minded, curious, mindlessly happy and perpetually innocent, the strip's title character drifts through life in Coconino County without a care. Krazy's dialogue is a highly stylized argot ("A fowl konspirissy – is it pussible?") phonetically evoking a mixture of English, French, Spanish, Yiddish and other dialects, often identified as George Herriman's own native New Orleans dialect, Yat. Often singing and dancing to express the Kat's eternal joy, Krazy is hopelessly in love with Ignatz and thinks that the mouse's brick-tossing is his way of returning that love. Krazy is also completely unaware of the bitter rivalry between Ignatz and "Offissa" Pupp and mistakes the dog's frequent imprisonment of the mouse for an innocent game of tag ("Ever times I see them two playing games togedda, Ignatz seems to be It"). On those occasions when Ignatz is caught before he can launch his brick, Krazy is left pining for the "l'il ainjil" and wonders where the beloved mouse has gone.

Krazy's own gender is never made clear and appears to be fluid, varying from strip to strip. Most authors post-Herriman (beginning with Cummings) have mistakenly referred to Krazy only as female, but Krazy's creator was more ambiguous and even published several strips poking fun at this uncertainty. When filmmaker Frank Capra, a fan of the strip, asked Herriman to straightforwardly define the character's sex, the cartoonist admitted that Krazy was "something like a sprite, an elf. They have no sex. So that Kat can't be a he or a she. The Kat's a spirit—a pixie—free to butt into anything."  Most characters inside the strip use "he" and "him" to refer to Krazy, likely as a gender-neutral "he".

Ignatz Mouse 

Ignatz is driven to distraction by Krazy Kat's naïveté, and generally reacts by throwing bricks at Krazy's head.  To shield his plans from Officer Pupp, Ignatz hides his bricks, disguises himself, or enlists the aid of willing Coconino County denizens (without making his intentions clear). Easing Ignatz's task is Krazy Kat's willingness to meet him anywhere at any appointed time, eager to receive a token of affection in the form of a brick to the head.  Ignatz is married with three children, though they are rarely seen.

Ironically, although Ignatz seems to generally have contempt for Krazy, one strip shows his ancestor, Mark Antony Mouse, fall in love with Krazy's ancestor, an Egyptian cat princess (calling her his "Star of the Nile"), and pay a sculptor to carve a brick with a love message. When he throws it at her, he is arrested, but she announces her love for him, and from that day on, he throws bricks at her to show his love for her (which would explain why Krazy believes that Ignatz throwing bricks is a sign of love). In another strip, Krazy kisses a sleeping Ignatz, and hearts appear above the mouse's head.

In the last five (or so) years of the strip, Ignatz's feelings of animosity for Krazy were noticeably downplayed. While earlier, one got the sense of his taking advantage of Krazy's willingness to be "bricked", now one gets the sense of Ignatz and Krazy as chummy co-conspirators against Pupp, with Ignatz at times quite aware of the positive way Krazy interprets his missiles.

Officer Bull Pupp 
A police dog who loves Krazy, and always tries (sometimes successfully) to thwart Ignatz's desires to pelt Krazy Kat with bricks. Officer Pupp and Ignatz often try to get the better of each other even when Krazy is not directly involved, as they both enjoy seeing the other played for a fool. He appears slightly less frequently than Krazy and Ignatz. He is also the main character of his own short film series.

Secondary characters 
Beyond these three, Coconino County is populated with an assortment of incidental, recurring characters.
Joe Stork: the "purveyor of progeny to prince & proletarian", often makes baby deliveries to various characters. (In one strip, Ignatz tries to trick him into dropping a brick onto Krazy's head from above.) The character debuted in Gooseberry Sprig as the titular character's "Prime Minister." 
Kolin Kelly: a dog; a brickmaker by trade who bakes his wares in a kiln.  Often Ignatz's source for projectiles, although he distrusts the mouse.
Mrs. Kwakk Wakk: a duck in a pillbox hat, a scold and busybody who frequently notices Ignatz in the course of his plotting and informs Officer Pupp. She is a social climber, attempting in one strip continuity to replace Pupp as police chief.

Other characters who make semi-frequent appearances are: 
Walter Cephus Austridge: a nondescript ostrich
Bum Bil Bee: a transient, bearded insect
Don Kiyote: an inconsequential heterodox Mexican coyote
Mock Duck: a clairvoyant fowl of Chinese descent who operates a cleaning establishment.
Gooseberry Sprig: the Duck Duke, who briefly starred in his own strip before Krazy Kat was created.
Also: Krazy's Aunt Tabby and Uncle Tom; and his aerial and aquatic cousins, respectively: Krazy Katbird and Krazy Katfish. 
Ignatz also has relations; his family of look-alike mice includes his wife, Mathilda and a trio of equally unruly sons named Milton, Marshall and Irving.

History 
Krazy Kat evolved from an earlier comic strip of Herriman's, The Dingbat Family, which started in June 1910 and was later renamed The Family Upstairs. This comic chronicled the Dingbats' attempts to avoid the mischief of the mysterious unseen family living in the apartment above theirs and to unmask that family. Herriman would complete the daily comics about the Dingbats, and finding himself with time left over in his 8-hour work day, filled the bottom of the strip with slapstick drawings of the upstairs family's mouse preying upon the Dingbats' cat.

This "basement strip" grew into something much larger than the original cartoon. Krazy Kat first appeared as its own daily comic strip in 1911, and then again in the summer of 1912, although only temporarily at the time. It again became a daily comic strip (running vertically down the side of the page) in October 1913, and was thereafter to remain in syndication for more than thirty years. A black and white, full-page Krazy Kat Sunday comic was launched on April 23, 1916. Possibly due to the objections of editors, who did not think it was suitable for the comics sections, Krazy Kat originally appeared in the Hearst papers' art and drama sections. It has been claimed that Hearst himself, however, enjoyed the strip so much that he gave Herriman a lifetime contract and guaranteed the cartoonist complete creative freedom, although according to Michael Tisserand's biography on Herriman (2016), there exists no proof that this alleged lifetime contract was ever made or signed.

Despite its relatively low popularity among the general public, Krazy Kat gained a wide following among intellectuals. In 1922, a jazz ballet based on the comic was produced and scored by John Alden Carpenter; though the performance played to sold-out crowds on two nights and was given positive reviews in The New York Times and The New Republic, it failed to boost the strip's popularity as Hearst had hoped. In addition to Seldes and Cummings, contemporary admirers of Krazy Kat included T. S. Eliot, Willem de Kooning, H. L. Mencken, P. G. Wodehouse, Jack Kerouac, and artist Paul Nash. In 1931, Nash wrote that "No country has produced, in the narrow limits of this medium, a fantastic philosopher such as George Herriman." Reportedly, president Woodrow Wilson also read the strip regularly. More recent scholars and authors have seen the strip as reflecting the Dada movement and prefiguring postmodernism.

In the summer of 1934, the Krazy Kat Sunday page was temporarily shelved, although the daily strip continued as before. Beginning in June 1935, Krazy Kat's Sunday page returned, and was thereafter published in full color. Though the number of newspapers carrying it dwindled in its last decade, Herriman continued to draw Krazy Kat, creating roughly 3,000 comics in total, until his death in April 1944 (the final Sunday page was published exactly two months later, on June 25). Hearst promptly canceled the strip after the artist died, because, contrary to the common practice of the time, he did not want to see a new cartoonist take over.

Animated adaptations 

The comic strip was animated several times (see filmography below).  The earliest Krazy Kat shorts were produced by Hearst, starting with the release of Introducing Krazy Kat and Ignatz Mouse in February 1916. More than 25 similar animated silent shorts were made until August 1917. They were produced under Hearst-Vitagraph News Pictorial and later the International Film Service (IFS), though Herriman was not involved.

In early 1920, after a two-year hiatus, the John R. Bray studio began producing a second series of Krazy Kat shorts. These cartoons hewed close to the comic strips, including Ignatz, Pupp and other standard supporting characters. Krazy's ambiguous gender and feelings for Ignatz were usually preserved; bricks were occasionally thrown. Bray Productions produced at least eleven such Krazy Kat shorts until February 1921, after which the series ended. With added sound effects and music, these (originally silent) cartoons were in periodic reissue also during the 1930s and 1940s, and ended up being syndicated to television in the 1950s.

In 1925, animation pioneer Bill Nolan decided to bring Krazy to the screen again.  Nolan intended to produce the series under Associated Animators, but when it dissolved, he sought distribution from Margaret J. Winkler. Unlike earlier adaptations, Nolan did not base his shorts on the characters and setting of the Herriman comic strip. Instead, the feline in Nolan's cartoons was a male cat whose design and personality both reflected Felix the Cat. This is probably due to the fact that Nolan himself was a former employee of the Pat Sullivan studio. Other Herriman characters appeared in the Nolan cartoons at first, though similarly altered: Kwakk Wakk was at times Krazy's paramour, with Ignatz often the bully trying to break up the romance. Over time, Nolan's influence waned and new directors, Ben Harrison and Manny Gould, took over the series. By late 1927, they were solely in charge.

Winkler's husband, Charles Mintz, slowly began assuming control of the operation. Mintz and his studio (later known as Screen Gems) began producing the cartoons in sound beginning with 1929's Ratskin. In 1931, he moved the staff to California and ultimately changed the design of Krazy Kat. The new character bore even less resemblance to the one in the newspapers. Mintz's Krazy Kat was, like many other early 1930s cartoon characters, imitative of Mickey Mouse, and usually engaged in slapstick comic adventures with his look-alike girlfriend and loyal pet dog. In 1936, animator Isadore Klein, with the blessing of Mintz, set to work creating the short Lil' Ainjil, the only Mintz work that was intended to reflect Herriman's comic strip. However, Klein was "terribly disappointed" with the resulting cartoon, and the Mickey-derivative Krazy returned.  In 1939, Mintz became indebted to his distributor, Columbia Pictures, and subsequently sold his studio to them.  The studio released its final Krazy Kat cartoon, The Mouse Exterminator, in January 1940 as part of their Phantasies series, which was also the last screen adaptation of Krazy Kat to be made during Herriman's lifetime. In the 1960s, some of the later shorts were colorized and released on Super 8mm film.

As had been the case with the animated Krazy Kat shorts of the silent era, Herriman was not involved in the making of the sound shorts of the 1930s.

King Features produced 50 Krazy Kat cartoons from 1962 to 1964, most of which were created at Gene Deitch's Rembrandt Films in Prague, Czechoslovakia (now the Czech Republic), whilst the rest were produced by Artransa Film Studios in Sydney, Australia.  The cartoons were initially televised interspersed with Beetle Bailey (some of which were also produced by Artransa) and Snuffy Smith cartoons to form a half-hour TV show, The King Features Trilogy. These cartoons helped to introduce Herriman's cat to the baby boomers. 27 of these cartoons have been made available on DVD within the "Advantage Cartoon Mega Pack" set.

The King Features shorts of the 1960s were made for television and have a closer connection to the comic strip; the backgrounds are drawn in a similar style, Ignatz was present and once again the reluctant object of Krazy's affection. This incarnation of Krazy was made female; Penny Phillips voiced Krazy while Paul Frees voiced Ignatz. The recurring character Officer Bull Pupp also appeared often in this series, though his love of Krazy did not play a role in very many of the stories. Jay Livingston and Ray Evans did the music for most of the episodes.  Most of the episodes are available on DVD.

Comic book adaptation 
In 1951, Dell Publishing revived the characters for a run of comic books. All five issues were drawn by cartoonist John Stanley, best known for his Little Lulu comic books. While the general plot premise is reminiscent of Herriman's strip, the look and feel are entirely different: firmly in the visual and written style of 1950s talking animal strips for children. Krazy is male in this version of the strip while Ignatz is female. This "Krazy Kat" also made several one-shot appearances in Dell's Four Color Comics series, from 1953 through 1956 (#s 454, 504, 548, 619, 696) and was reprinted in some Gold Key and Page Comics over the next decade.

Chronology of formats 
The strip went through several format changes during its run, each of which impacted the artwork and the narratives that the form of the strip could accommodate.  What follows are the landmarks, which can also help to date the era of a given strip.

 July 26, 1910: First "beaning" of Kat by Mouse at bottom of The Dingbat Family. Strip is not sectioned off, but a detail at the bottom of the panels. Strip as a whole tended to run 4 inches × 13 inches.  Soon the Kat and Mouse were a five-panel 1½ inch strip at the bottom of the cartoon.
 1911:  First brief run of Krazy and I. Mouse standalone strips (probably as a replacement to The Family Upstairs).  Also, the characters briefly take over the strip for a couple of periods in 1912 (at least once, while the Dingbats are "on holiday" in July 1912.)
 October 28, 1913.  Krazy Kat debuts as a five-panel daily vertical strip which runs down the side of a full comics page. This remains its daily format until sometime in 1920.
 April 23, 1916:  First black and white full page Sunday strip.
 March 4 – October 30, 1920:  The "Panoramic Dailies" period, where Herriman is allowed to experiment wildly in an unbroken daily horizontal 3 × 13 inch space.
 November 1920 on:  Herriman is constrained to a more conventional daily horizontal format containing three equal split sections, with the center section further split in two.  This allows the strip to be run full page, half page or a third of a page, according to editorial whim.  From September 13 to October 15, 1921, Herriman regains some control (no split center section) and resumes the previous years' format experiments.
 January 7 – March 11, 1922: In the New York Journal, 10 weeks of Saturday full-page color strips, in addition to the ongoing Sunday full page black-and-white strips. (In other words, two original full-page strips every week).  This is then canceled due to its lack of noticeable commercial success, compared to the new Saturday color sections in out-of-town Hearst papers which contained no Krazy Kat.
 August 1925 to September 1929: Sundays are confined to 3-row, split-middle-line format allowing some papers to reduce cartoon's size and reformat into two daily-sized rows.
 Summer 1934: Full page Sunday strips cease entirely, for roughly a year.
 June 1, 1935:  Full page Sunday strips resume, now in color, until Herriman's death.
 December 11, 1938: "Optional" horizontal panel begins running on bottom of Sunday strips, as placeholder for potential advertising.
 June 3, 1944: Final daily strip published.
 June 25, 1944: Final Sunday strip published.

Legacy 
In 1934, the live action film Babes in Toyland starring Stan Laurel and Oliver Hardy the cat playing the fiddle (Peter Gordon) is repeatedly hit in the head with a brick by a mouse (a capuchin monkey) costumed to look similar to Disney's Mickey Mouse.

In 1984, Cyndi Lauper pays homage to Krazy Kat  in her song "Yeah Yeah" overdubbing the phrase in Krazy Kat's vocal style, "Ignatz, I love you" during the second verse.

In 1994, the live action film Pulp Fiction starring John Travolta and Samuel L. Jackson, Krazy Kat, Ignatz Mouse and Officer Pup make an appearance printed on a pale blue T-shirt worn by Jackson's character Jules who had to hastily change his clothes after an accidental shooting in a car.

In 1999, Krazy Kat was rated #1 in a Comics Journal list of the best American comics of the 20th century; the list included both comic books and comic strips.  In 1995, the strip was one of 20 included in the Comic Strip Classics series of commemorative U.S. postage stamps.

In 2004, a picture of Krazy Kat appears on the wall of the Goofy Goober bar in The SpongeBob SquarePants Movie  alongside a picture of Popeye.

Krazy Kat has continued to inspire artists and cartoonists to the present day. Chuck Jones's Wile E. Coyote and Road Runner shorts, set in a similar visual pastiche of the American Southwest, are among the most famous cartoons to draw upon Herriman's work.  Patrick McDonnell, creator of the current strip Mutts and co-author of Krazy Kat: The Comic Art of George Herriman, cites it as his "foremost influence." Bill Watterson of Calvin and Hobbes fame named Krazy Kat among his three major influences (along with Peanuts and Pogo).  Watterson would revive Herriman's practice of employing varied, unpredictable panel layouts in his Sunday strips. Charles M. Schulz and Will Eisner both said that they were drawn towards cartooning partly because of the impact Krazy Kat made on them in their formative years. Bobby London's Dirty Duck was styled after Krazy Kat.

Jules Feiffer, Philip Guston, and Hunt Emerson have all had Krazy Kat's imprint recognized in their work. Larry Gonick's comic strip Kokopelli & Company is set in "Kokonino County", an homage to Herriman's exotic locale. Chris Ware admires the strip, and his frequent publisher, Fantagraphics, is currently reissuing its entire run in volumes designed by Ware (which also include reproduction of Herriman miscellanea, some of it donated by Ware). In the 1980s, Sam Hurt's syndicated strip Eyebeam shows a clear Herriman influence, particularly in its continually morphing backgrounds.  Among non-cartoonists, Jay Cantor's 1987 novel Krazy Kat uses Herriman's characters to analyze humanity's reaction to nuclear weapons, Russell Hoban's novel The Medusa Frequency (also 1987) uses a quote from the cartoon in an epigraph ("ZIP... POW... LOVES ME") while Michael Stipe of the rock band R.E.M. has a tattoo of Krazy and Ignatz. In one Garfield comic strip, where it shows the Garfield logo, one can see Ignatz throwing a brick at Garfield. Also, in the Garfield TV special Garfield: His 9 Lives, Garfield plays a stunt double for Krazy Kat.  In one 1989 Bloom County strip by Berke Breathed, Krazy and Ignatz can be seen watching Binkley, Oliver, and Opus float through a Herriman-esque landscape and in a couple of 9 Chickweed Lane strips,  Krazy and Ignatz are referred to in regards to a printed training bra once worn by Edda during her preteen years.

Reprints and compilations 
For many decades, only a small percentage of Herriman's strip was available in reprinted form.  The first Krazy Kat collection, published by Henry Holt and Company in 1946, just two years after Herriman's death, gathered 200 selected strips.  In Europe, the cartoons were first reprinted in 1965 by the Italian magazine Linus, and appeared in the pages of the French monthly Charlie Mensuel starting in 1970.  In 1969, Grosset & Dunlap produced a single hardcover collection of selected episodes and sequences spanning the entire length of the strip's run.  The Netherlands' Real Free Press published five issues of Krazy Kat Komix in 1974–1976, containing a few hundred strips apiece; each of the issues' covers was designed by Joost Swarte.  However, owing to the difficulty of tracking down high-quality copies of the original newspapers, no plans for a comprehensive collection of Krazy Kat strips surfaced until the 1980s.

All of the Sunday strips from 1916 to 1924 were reprinted by Eclipse Comics in cooperation with Turtle Island Press. Beginning in 1988, the intent was to eventually reprint every Sunday Krazy Kat, but this planned series was aborted when Eclipse ceased business in 1992. Beginning in 2002, Fantagraphics resumed reprinting Sunday Krazy Kats where Eclipse left off; in 2008, their tenth release completed the run with 1944. Fantagraphics then reissued, in the same format, the strips previously printed in Eclipse's now out-of-print volumes. Both the Eclipse and Fantagraphics reprints include additional rarities such as older George Herriman cartoons predating Krazy Kat.

In 1990, Kitchen Sink Press, in association with Remco Worldservice Books, reprinted two volumes of color Sunday strips dating from 1935 to 1937; but like Eclipse, they collapsed before they could continue the series.  The 3-D Zone #5, published by The 3-D Zone in June 1987, features reprints of Krazy Kat strips converted into 3-D, and  includes two pairs of red/blue 3-D glasses

The daily strips for 1921 to 1923 were reprinted by Pacific Comics Club.  The 1922 and 1923 books skipped a small number of strips, which have now been reprinted by Comics Revue. Comics Revue also published all of the daily strips from September 8, 1930 through December 31, 1934. In 2007, Fantagraphics offered a one-shot reprint of daily strips from 1910s and 1920s, and plans a more complete reprinting of the daily strip in the future.

Scattered Sundays and dailies have appeared in several collections, including the Grosset & Dunlap book reprinted by Nostalgia Press, but the most readily available sampling of Sundays and dailies from throughout the strip's run is Krazy Kat: The Comic Art of George Herriman, published by Harry N. Abrams, Inc. in 1986. It includes a detailed biography of Herriman and was, for a long time, the only in-print book to republish Krazy Kat strips from after 1940. Although it contains over 200 strips, including many color Sundays, it is light on material from 1923 to 1937. Small selections of dailies appear in literary anthologies published by The Green Bag.

Henry Holt & Co. 
 Krazy Kat (1946) Introduction by e.e. cummings. Hardcover B&W compilation of daily and Sunday strips, concentrating on 1930–1944.

Grosset & Dunlap/Nostalgia Press/Madison Square Press 
 Krazy Kat: A Classic from the Golden Age of Comics (1969, 1975) An entirely different compilation of dailies and Sundays, with examples from the entire run of the strip—including 23 The Dingbat Family bottom strips.  Reprints the e.e. cummings introduction from the Henry Holt volume. 8 pages in full color; some later editions have daily strips reproduced in blue ink.  (hardcover),  (paperback)

Street Enterprises (Menomonee Falls) 
 (George Herriman's) Krazy Kat Vol. 1, No. 1 (March 1973) 32-page newsprint magazine reprinting 60 daily strips from July 3 – October 28, 1933. (Inside cover claims inaccurately that they are from 1935.)

Real Free Press 
 Krazy Kat Komix, Nos. 1–5 (1974–1976) Joost Swarte, ed. The 5-issue magazine also features other Herriman strips.

Hyperion Press 
 The Family Upstairs: Introducing Krazy Kat: The Complete Strip, 1910–1912 (1977, 1992) Introduction by Bill Blackbeard.  (hardcover),  (softcover)

Harry N. Abrams 
 Krazy Kat: The Comic Art of George Herriman (1986) Patrick McDonnell, Karen O'Connell, eds. Various strips in B&W and color, mostly from original art, including some watercolor paintings.  (hardcover),  (softcover)

Morning Star Publications 
 Coconino Chronicle (1988) Alec Finlay, ed. 130 strips from 1927 to 1928.

Eclipse Comics 
Krazy and Ignatz: The Komplete Kat Komics (series), Bill Blackbeard, ed. Each of these volumes reprints a year of Sunday strips.
 Vol 1: Krazy & Ignatz (1988) 1916 strips. 
 Vol 2: The Other Side To the Shore Of Here (1989) 1917 strips. 
 Vol 3: The Limbo of Useless Unconsciousness (1989) 1918 strips. 
 Vol 4: Howling Among the Halls of Night (1989) 1919 strips. 
 Vol 5: Pilgrims on the Road to Nowhere (1990) 1920 strips. 
 Vol 6: Sure As Moons is Cheeses (1990) 1921 strips. 
 Vol 7: A Katnip Kantata in the Key of K (1991) 1922 strips, including 10 color Saturday strips. 
 Vol 8: Inna Yott On the Muddy Geranium (1991) 1923 strips. 
 Vol 9: Shed a Soft Mongolian Tear (1992) 1924 strips. 
 Vol 10: Honeysuckil Love Is Doubly Swit (unpublished) 1925 strips.

Kitchen Sink Press 
The Komplete Kolor Krazy Kat (series). Each volume reprinted two years of Sundays. (The publisher dissolved before the series' aim of completeness could be achieved.)
 Vol 1: 1935–1936 (1990) Rick Marshall, Bill Watterson, contributors. 
 Vol 2: 1936–1937 (1991) Rick Marshall, ed.

Stinging Monkey/BookSurge 
 Krazy & Ignatz, The Dailies. Vol 1: 1918–1919 (2001, 2003) Gregory Fink, ed., introduction by Bill Blackbeard. (Stinging Monkey edition in large format, . BookSurge reprint in smaller 7.9 × 6 inch format)

Pacific Comics 
All the Daily Strips.... (series) 6¼ x 6¼ inch format.
 Krazy Kat vol 1: 1921 (2003)
 Krazy Kat vol 2: 1922 (2004)
 Krazy Kat Vol 3: 1923 (2005)
Presents Krazy and Ignatz (series) Four 3¼ x 4 inch volumes reproducing the 1921 strips in miniature.

Fantagraphics Books 
In 2002, Fantagraphics began to publish a series of paperback – picking up where Eclipse Comics left off (see above) –, with introductory essays and other bonuses, such as rare artworks and photographs. Bill Blackbeard is the series editor, Chris Ware the cover and interior designer.For the first time ever, Fantagraphics reprinted the entirety of Krazy Kat Sundays: the first ten volumes collect two years worth of Sundays each (the first five in black and white, the last five in color – reflecting the shift in the original newspaper version); the last three paperbacks comprise the black and white Sundays already reprinted by Eclipse, presenting three years worth of material per volume.
 Krazy & Ignatz in "There Is A Heppy Lend Furfur A-Waay": 1925–1926 (2002) 
 Krazy & Ignatz in "Love Letters In Ancient Brick": 1927–1928 (2002) 
 Krazy & Ignatz in "A Mice, A Brick, A Lovely Night": 1929–1930 (2003) 
 Krazy & Ignatz in "A Kat Alilt with Song": 1931–1932 (2004) 
 Krazy & Ignatz in "Necromancy by the Blue Bean Bush": 1933–1934 (2005) 
 Krazy & Ignatz: The Complete Sunday Strips: 1925–1934 (Collects the previous five paperbacks in a single hardcover volume. Only 1000 copies printed, only available by direct order from the publisher.) 
 Krazy & Ignatz in "A Wild Warmth of Chromatic Gravy": 1935–1936 (2005) , 2005
 Krazy & Ignatz in "Shifting Sands Dusts its Cheeks in Powdered Beauty": 1937–1938 (2006) 
 Krazy & Ignatz in "A Brick Stuffed with Moom-bins": 1939–1940 (2007) 
 Krazy & Ignatz in "A Ragout of Raspberries": 1941–1942 (2007) 
 Krazy & Ignatz in "He Nods in Quiescent Siesta": 1943–1944 (2008) 
 Krazy & Ignatz: The Complete Sunday Strips: 1935–1944 (Collects the previous five paperbacks in a single hardcover volume. Only 1000 copies printed, only available by direct order from the publisher.) 
 Krazy & Ignatz in "Love in a Kestle or Love in a Hut": 1916–1918 (2010) 
 Krazy & Ignatz in "A Kind, Benevolent and Amiable Brick": 1919–1921 (2011) 
 Krazy & Ignatz in "At Last My Drim of Love Has Come True": 1922–1924 (2012)  (also includes the complete Us Husbands, another strip of Herriman, unrelated to Krazy Kat)
 Krazy & Ignatz: The Complete Sunday Strips: 1916–1924 (Collects the previous three paperbacks in a single hardcover volume. Only 1000 copies printed, only available by direct order from the publisher.) 
The following volume, unrelated to the previous collection (both in design and format), is a horizontal hardcover which reprints daily strips from 1911 to 1912 and from 1914, plus 9 months of large-format dailies from 1920 and an additional month from late 1921, and the artworks that Herriman drew for the promotion of a 1922 pantomime ballet based on Krazy Kat.
 Krazy & Ignatz: The Kat Who Walked in Beauty (2007) 
Starting from 2019, Fantagraphics began to publish a new collection of Krazy Kat Sundays. The George Herriman Library: Krazy & Ignatz, a series of deluxe hardcovers, whose format is much wider than the one of the previous paperbacks, collects 3 years worth of Sundays per volume. The bonus material, while largely similar to the one of the previous collection, presents some differences, though, such as new essays and images. Michael Catron and Bill Blackbeard are the series editors, Keeli McCarthy the cover and interior designer.
The George Herriman Library: Krazy & Ignatz 1916–1918 (2019) 
The George Herriman Library: Krazy & Ignatz 1919–1921 (2020) 
The George Herriman Library: Krazy & Ignatz 1922–1924 (2022) 
The George Herriman Library: Krazy & Ignatz 1925–1927 (2023)

Sunday Press Books 
 Krazy Kat: A Celebration of Sundays (2010) Patrick McDonnell, Peter Maresca, eds. Sunday Press Books. Various Sundays reprinted in their original size and colors.  (hardcover)

IDW Publishing 
 George Herriman's Krazy + Ignatz in Tiger Tea (January 2010) Craig Yoe, ed. Collects the "Tiger Tea" storyline from the daily strips, May 1936 – March 1937.  (hardcover)
 LOAC Essentials Presents King Features Volume 1: Krazy Kat 1934 By George Herriman (April 2016) Dean Mullaney, ed. Collects a years worth of daily strips, Dec 25, 1933 – Dec 31, 1934.

Taschen 
 George Herriman's "Krazy Kat": The Complete Color Sundays 1935-1944 (August 2019) Alexander Braun ed. XXL Hardcover (300 mm × 440 mm). 632 pages. Available in three languages.
 English - 
 German - 
 French -

Filmography

Theme park
Krazy Kat is featured in the Universal Studios Florida theme park Islands of Adventure, where Ignatz is seen throwing down a brick on Krazy's head in Toon Lagoon.

See also 

The Krazy Kat Klub, a Bohemian nightspot in Washington, D.C. during the early decades of the 20th century, named after the comic strip.
 Kish, Frances. "Watch 'Em Move: A Short Biography of Krazy Kat and Some of His Goofy Friends," Photoplay, September 1930, p. 71. Article on animation.

Notes

References 
 Blackbeard, Bill. "A Kat of Many Kolors: Jazz pantomime and the funny papers in 1922." (1991). Printed in A Katnip Kantata in the Key of K (q.v.)
 Bloom, John. "Krazy Kat keeps kracking." United Press International, June 23, 2003.
 Crafton, Donald (1993). Before Mickey: The Animated Film, 1898–1928. University of Chicago Press. .
 Crocker, Elisabeth. "' To He, I Am For Evva True': Krazy Kat's Indeterminate Gender." Postmodern Culture, January 1995.  January 12, 2006.
 Heer, Jeet.  "Cartoonists in Navajo Country." Comic Art, Summer 2006. 40–47.
 Herriman, George (1990). Pilgrims on the Road to Nowhere. Forestville: Turtle Island, Eclipse Books. .
 Herriman, George (1991). A Katnip Kantata in the Key of K. Forestville: Turtle Island/Eclipse Books. .
 Herriman, George (2002). Krazy & Ignatz 1925–1926: "There Is A Heppy Land, Fur, Far Awa-a-ay -". Seattle: Fantagraphics Books. .
 Herriman, George (2003). Krazy & Ignatz 1929–1930: "A Mice, A Brick, A Lovely Night". Seattle: Fantagraphics Books. .
 Herriman, George (2004). Krazy & Ignatz 1933–1934: "Necromancy by the Blue Bean Bush". Seattle: Fantagraphics Books. .
 Inge, Thomas (1990). "Krazy Kat as American Dada Art" Comics as Culture, Jackson: University Press of Mississippi. .
 Kramer, Hilton. Untitled review of Herriman art exhibition. The New York Times, January 17, 1982.
 Maltin, Leonard (1987). Of Mice and Magic: A History of American Animated Cartoons. Penguin Books. .
 McDonnell, Patrick; O'Connell, Karen; de Havenon, Georgia Riley (1986) Krazy Kat: The Comic Art of George Herriman. New York: Harry N. Abrams, Inc. .
 Schwartz, Ben (2003). "Hearst, Herriman, and the Death of Nonsense." Printed in Krazy & Ignatz 1929–1930: "A Mice, A Brick, A Lovely Night." (q.v.)
 Shannon, Edward A. "'That we may mis-unda-stend each udda': The Rhetoric of Krazy Kat." Journal of Popular Culture, Fall 1995, vol. 29, issue 2.
 Tashlin, Frank. "In Coconino County". The New York Times, November 3, 1946, p. 161.
 Watterson, Bill (1995). The Calvin and Hobbes Tenth Anniversary Book. Kansas City: Andrews and McMeel.

External links 

Krazy Kat at Internet Archive (comic strips, video and audio)
 – History, bios, strip archive, bibliography and more.
"'Some Say It with a Brick': George Herriman's Krazy Kat" – A critical essay.

 
American comic strips
1910 comics debuts
Comics characters introduced in 1910
Gag-a-day comics
Romance comics
1944 comics endings
Columbia cartoons series and characters
Fantagraphics titles
Comics about cats
Comics about dogs
Comics about mice and rats
Comics about police officers
Anthropomorphic cats
Fictional characters from Arizona
Comics set in Arizona
Kitchen Sink Press titles
Androgyny in fiction
Surreal comedy
Articles containing video clips
Comics spin-offs
American comics characters
Comics adapted into animated series
Comics adapted into television series
2021 comics debuts
Comics by George Herriman
African-American comics
Rembrandt Films
Screen Gems film series
Comic strips started in the 1910s
Comic strips started in the 2020s